Carl C. Forsaith (September 2, 1888 - August 15, 1982) was an author, writer and politician from Auburn, New Hampshire. He is most well known for writing Auburn's official history book, published in 1945.

Biography 
Carl Forsaith was born on the Chester Turnpike in Auburn, New Hampshire on 2 September 1888. He went to Auburn Village School and Pinkerton Academy. He graduated with a writers' diploma and worked as a columnist for Manchester's Union Leader. He wrote Auburn's official history book in 1944, which contained geography information, Native American legends, etc. Forsaith, a Democrat, then served on Auburn's Board of Selectmen for almost 15 years up to his death. He died of natural causes on 15 August 1982 in his home on Chester Turnpike.

Legacy 
Forsaiths political skills helped shape how Auburn is run today. Was married to Grace Dolber, but, had no children, he had no individual to continue his works and keep the town's history. He donated his journal and other personal possessions to the Town of Auburn. They are now kept in the Griffin Free Public Library. His home on the Chester Turnpike was demolished because of mold in June 2012.

Notable works 
Forsaith wrote many history books, one for his hometown, one for the state, several for the country etc. His home that he was born and lived in most of his life is still standing on the Chester Turnpike, the second-oldest house in the town.

1964 deaths
People from Auburn, New Hampshire
Writers from New Hampshire
New Hampshire Democrats
Pinkerton Academy alumni
1888 births